A sous-chef is a chef who is second in command of a kitchen – the person ranking right after the head chef. In large kitchens, sous-chefs generally manage members of the kitchen on behalf of the head chef who is usually preoccupied with other tasks.

Duties and functions
The sous-chef has many responsibilities, because the executive chef has a more overarching role. Sous-chefs must plan and direct how the food is presented on the plate, keep their kitchen staff in order, train new chefs, create the work schedule, and make sure all the food that goes to customers is of the best quality to maintain high standards.

Sous-chefs are in charge of making sure all kitchen equipment is in working order. They must thoroughly understand how to use and troubleshoot all appliances and cooking instruments in the event of a malfunctioning cooking device. Sous-chefs are in charge of disciplining any kitchen staff who may have acted against restaurant policy. Incentive programs are commonly used among sous-chefs to encourage their staff to abide by rules and regulations, and motivate them to work efficiently at all times. Under the oversight of the sous-chef, downtime should be used for prepping, cleaning and other kitchen duties. They are responsible for inventory, product and supply rotation, and menu tasting. Sous-chefs need to be responsive and have the ability to improvise when a problem arises while the restaurant is busy. They must also ensure safety precautions and sanitary provisions are taken to ensure a safe and clean working environment.

Qualifications
Many sous-chefs get to their position via promotion, after training and experience in the culinary profession.

In Canada, one way to advance to the sous-chef position is by getting a specialized college diploma, acquiring the knowledge necessary to qualify to take the Red Seal for the Journeyman Cook exam. A year after completing the exam, it is possible to enroll in the Chef Program to take an exam with the Canadian Culinary Foundation. Then, after four to five years of working experience, one can apply to the Certified Chef de Cuisine program.

See also

 List of restaurant terminology

References

Restaurant staff
Restaurant terminology
Culinary terminology